Weltberühmt in Österreich – 50 Jahre Austropop   is an Austrian television series.

See also
List of Austrian television series

External links
 

Austrian television series
ORF (broadcaster)
2006 Austrian television series debuts
2008 Austrian television series endings
2000s Austrian television series
German-language television shows